Pelandaba–Mpopoma is a constituency of the National Assembly of the Parliament of Zimbabwe. Located in the city of Bulawayo in eastern Zimbabwe, it comprises the high-density suburbs of Imiyela, Mabutweni, Matshobana, Mpopoma, Mpopoma South, and Pelandaba. Its MP since the 2018 election is Charles Moyo of the Movement for Democratic Change Alliance.

Profile 
Pelandaba–Mpopoma comprises the high-density suburbs of Imiyela, Mabutweni, Matshobana, Mpopoma, Mpopoma South, and Pelandaba in the city/metropolitan province of Bulawayo. The constituency is marked by high levels of poverty and unemployment, with most constituents participating in black-market and informal work rather than working in the formal economy. Many constituents also depend on cross-border trading with Zimbabwe's neighboring countries. As of 2015, the constituency contained seven primary schools, three secondary schools, and two health centres.

History 
In the 2005 election, the constituency was won by Milton Gwetu of the Movement for Democratic Change. In the 2008 and 2013 elections, constituency elected MDC–T candidates Samuel Khumalo and Bekithemba Nyathi, respectively. On 4 March 2015, MDC–T leadership recalled Nyathi from parliament after the legislator joined a splinter group called the United MDC. Per Section 129 (1) (k) of the Constitution of Zimbabwe, a member of parliament is automatically recalled if that member ceases to belong to the political party on whose ticket he or she was elected. In a by-election held on 10 June 2015, Joseph Chuma of ZANU–PF was elected to replace Nyathi. In the 2018 election, Charles Moyo of the Movement for Democratic Change Alliance was elected for Pelandaba–Mpopoma, winning the constituency back for the opposition.

Members

References 

Bulawayo
Parliamentary constituencies in Zimbabwe